Tarte is a surname. Notable people with the surname include:

Joseph-Israël Tarte (1848–1907), Canadian politician and journalist
:de:Kevin Tarte (born 1957), American singer in Germany Beauty and the Beast (musical)
Sandra Tarte, Fijian academic and political commentator